Nailbridge Halt railway station served the suburb of Nailbridge, Gloucestershire, England, from 1907 to 1930 on the Mitcheldean Road and Forest of Dean Junction Railway.

History
The station was opened on 4 November 1907 by the Great Western Railway. It closed on 7 July 1930.

References 

Disused railway stations in Gloucestershire
Former Great Western Railway stations
Railway stations in Great Britain opened in 1907
Railway stations in Great Britain closed in 1930
1907 establishments in England
1930 disestablishments in England